The Hong Kong national baseball team is the representative team for Hong Kong in international baseball competition. The team finished 6th in the 2007 Asian Baseball Championship.

Current roster

Roster for the 2012 East Asian Cup:

Manager David Wong Tai Wai
Coaches Au Hok Leung (Head Coach), Ng Yuk Ming, Chan Tsz Yeung

Alumni
The team, consisting of young Chinese men, courted some controversy in the Hong Kong media, when they were shown naked on camera in a Hong Kong film, City Without Baseball, with their private parts fully exposed in several scenes. One of the team's main players, Ron Heung Tze-Chun, who was also the main character in the film, has gone on to become a Hong Kong film actor.

Venues

Hong Kong Baseball uses two fields for practice and games:

 Sai Tso Wan Recreation Ground - located in Lam Tin, it is the training venue for the team and built on a landfill site in 2004
 Lion Rock Park Baseball Field - located to the left of the south end of Lion Rock Tunnel and south side of the larger Lion Rock Country Park, it is an alternate baseball venue for the team

References

External links
 
 HKBA (Chinese)

Baseball
National baseball teams in Asia